The following is a list of protected areas of Burkina Faso.

National parks
Burkina Faso has four national parks:
Arli National Park, existing since 1954 (see also Arly-Singou)
Deux Balés National Park
Kaboré Tambi National Park (formerly Pô National Park), existing since 1976
W of the Niger National Park, a transfrontier park existing since 1957

Unesco Biosphere reserve 
Mare aux Hippopotames
Arli National Park, since 2018

Ramsar sites 
 Mare d'Oursi

Complete reserves
Burkina Faso has three complete reserves:
 Bontioli Reserve, existing since 1957; 127 km², located in the province of Bougouriba (southwestern part of the country)
 Madjoari Reserve, existing since 1970; 170 km², located in the province of Tapoa (eastern part of the country)
 Singou Reserve, existing since 1955; 1926 km², located in the province of Gourma (eastern part of the country)

Partial reserves

Burkina Faso has six partial reserves:
 Partial Reserve of Arly, established in 1954, 900 km², province of Gourma (eastern part of the country)
 Partial Reserve of Kourtiagou, established in 1957, 510 km², in the province of Tapoa (eastern part of the country)
 Partial Reserve of Nakéré, established in 1957, 365 km², in the province of Bougouriba (southwestern part of the country)
 Partial Reserve of Pama, established in 1955, 2237 km², in the province of Kompienga
 Sylvo-Pastoral and Partial Faunal Reserve of the Sahel, in the very north of the country

Other reserves from IUCN-Categories I-VI 
 Nazinga Game Ranch (Ranch de Nazinga)

Protected forests

Burkina Faso also has several protected forests:
  Boulon Forest,  province la province de la Comoé (Cascades-Ouest du pays)
  Deux Balés Forest,  province des Balés (Boucle du Mouhoun), see Deux Balés National Park
  Dibon Forest,  province du Tuy
  Dida Forest, province de la Comoé (Cascades-Ouest du pays)
  Diéfoula Forest,  province de la Comoé (Cascades-Ouest du pays)
 Forêt classée de Babolo (Provinz Comoé, 5.5 km²)
 Forêt classée de Bahon (Provinz Houet, 16 km²)
 Forêt classée de Bambou (Provinz Houet, 18 km²)
 Forêt classée de Bansié (Provinz Houet, 3 km²)
 Forêt classée du Barrage de Ouagadougou (Provinz Kadiogo, 2.6 km²)
 Forêt classée de Bérégadougou (Provinz Comoé, 50 km²)
 Forêt classée de Bissiga (Provinz Oubritenga, 41 km²)
 Forêt classée de Bonou (Provinz Mouhoun, 17 km²)
 Forêt classée de Bontioli (Provinz Bougouriba, 295 km²)
 Forêt classée de Bougouriba (Provinz Bougouriba, 85 km²)
 Forêt classée de Bounouna (Provinz Comoé, 13 km²)
 Forêt classée de Dan (Provinz Houet, 43 km²)
 Forêt classée de Dem (Provinz Sanmatenga, 3.5 km²)
 Forêt classée de Dindéresso (Provinz Houet, 85 km²)
 Forêt classée de Gonsé (Provinz Oubritenga, 60 km²)
 Forêt classée de Gouandougou (Provinz Comoé, 95 km²)
 Forêt classée de Kalio (Provinz Sanguié, 120 km²)
 Forêt classée de Kapo (Provinz Houet, 99 km²)
 Forêt classée de Kari (Provinz Mouhoun, 130 km²)
 Forêt classée de Koa (Provinz Houet, 3.5 km²)
 Forêt classée de Kongoko (Provinz Comoé, 270 km²)
 Forêt classée de la Kou (Provinz Houet, 1.17 km²)
 Forêt classée de Koulbi (Provinz Poni, 400 km²)
 Forêt classée de Koulima (Provinz Houet, 21.5 km²)
 Forêt classée du Mare aux Hippopotames (Provinz Houet, 19 2 km²)
 Forêt classée de Maro (Provinz Houet, 500 km²)
 Forêt classée de Nabéré (Provinz Bougouriba, 365 km²)
 Forêt classée de Nakambé (Provinz Oubritenga, 980 km²)
 Forêt classée de Nasébou (Provinz Mouhoun, 140 km²)
 Forêt classée de Nazinga (Provinz Nahouri, 383 km²)
 Forêt classée de Niangoloko (Provinz Comoé, 66.54 km²)
 Forêt classée de Niouma (Provinz Passoré, 7.35 km²)
 Forêt classée de Ouilingoré (Provinz Boulgou, 68.5 km²)
 Forêt classée de Ouoro (Provinz Mouhoun, 140 km²)
 Forêt classée de Péni (Provinz Houet, 12 km²)
 Forêt classée du Pic de Nahouri (Provinz Nahouri, 8.36 km²)
 Forêt classée de Sâ (Provinz Mouhoun, 54 km²)
 Forêt classée de la Sissili (Provinz Sissili, 327 km²)
 Forêt classée de Sitenga (Provinz Kouritenga, 8.4 km²)
 Forêt classée de Sorobouty (Provinz Mouhoun, 58 km²)
 Forêt classée de la Source du Mouhoun (Provinz Comoé, 1 km²)
 Forêt classée de Sourou (Provinz Sourou, 140 km²)
 Forêt classée de Téré (Provinz Houet, 107 km²)
 Forêt classée de Tissé (Provinz Mouhoun, 215 km²)
 Forêt classée de Toroba (Provinz Mouhoun, 27 km²)
 Forêt classée de Tougouri (Provinz Namentenga, 0.4 km²)
 Forêt classée de Toumousséni (Provinz Comoé, 25 km²)
 Forêt classée de Tuy (Provinz Mouhoun, 500 km²)
 Forêt classée de Twéssé (Provinz Passoré, 4.9 km²)
 Forêt classée de Wayen (Provinz Ganzourgou, 120 km²)
 Forêt classée de Yabo (Provinz Sanmatenga, 10 km²)
 Forêt classée de Yakala (Provinz Boulgou, 16 km²)
 Forêt classée de Yendéré (Provinz Comoé, 7 km²)
 Forêt classée de Ziga (Provinz Oubritenga, 90 km²)
  Laba Forest, province du Sanguié (Centre-Ouest du pays)
  Logoniégué Forest, province de la Comoé (Cascades-Ouest du pays)
  Koflandé Forest,  province de la Comoé (Cascades-Ouest du pays)
  Mou Forest, province du Tuy (Hauts-Bassins-Ouest du pays)
  Pâ Forest, province des Balés (Boucle du Mouhoun)

References

External links

Ministry of the Environment
CBD Country Study
Unesco Arly Biosphere Reserve

 
Burkina Faso
National parks
Protected areas